Analyze That is a 2002 American mafia comedy film directed by Harold Ramis and produced by Paula Weinstein and Jane Rosenthal. The film is a sequel to the 1999 film Analyze This. The film starred Robert De Niro and Billy Crystal who respectively reprise their roles as mobster Paul Vitti and psychiatrist Ben Sobel.

Following the success of the first film, Warner Bros. developed a follow up to the film, with much of the same cast and crew returning. Analyze That was released on December 6, 2002, however, did not achieve the commercial success that the first film had, grossing only $55 million worldwide against its $60 million budget.

Plot
Near the completion of his sentence in Sing Sing, Paul Vitti's life is threatened by assassins and corrupt guards while incarcerated. He starts singing showtunes from West Side Story to get the attention of Ben Sobel, who previously hung up on him while attending his father's funeral. 

The FBI calls in Ben to perform psychiatric tests on Paul to determine if he is feigning insanity. After the tests, it appears Paul's mental state is deteriorating, and the FBI approves Paul's release for one month, into Ben's custody, for further therapy. As Ben drives Paul from prison, Paul immediately reveals that he was faking. 

Ben talks Paul into finding a regular job as requested by the FBI. Paul attempts to find a legitimate job (he tries a car dealer, a restaurant, and a jewelry store), but his rude manners and paranoia only complicate things further. This ends up in him getting fired each time.

At the same time, Paul is told by de facto boss Patti LoPresti that the Rigazzi family wants him dead. He responds to this by telling the Rigazzis that he is "out" and seeking a new line of employment. He eventually finds employment working as a technical advisor on the set of a mafia TV series. 

Meanwhile, FBI agents inform Ben that Paul has his former crew back together, and may be planning something major. This rouses Ben's suspicion, and he visits Paul. Both get caught up in a car chase with Rigazzi hitmen, which ends up with Paul escaping. The FBI blames Ben, and gives him 24 hours to locate Paul.

After locating Paul through Ben's son Michael, who is now working as Paul's chauffeur, Ben discovers Paul is planning a big armored car heist with LoPresti as a partner. He attempts to intervene and talk Paul out of it but Paul proceeds and Ben is forced to go along as well. 

The crew ambushes the armored car with smoke grenades, and lift it over a fence in the midst of the confusion. They extract over $22 million of gold bullion, but LoPresti's thugs take over, revealing themselves to actually have been working for Rigazzi. 

Ben, in a fit of anger, beats one of them, and Paul's men apprehend the others. They use the gold bullion to frame the Rigazzi family, leaving three Rigazzi goons locked in the armored truck suspended from the crane. This leads to the arrest of the entire Rigazzi family, and in turn, prevents a mob war.

Ben meets with Paul and Jelly near bridges on the New York waterfront, and they part ways again as friends, singing another West Side Story showtune together. During the credits, bloopers are shown.

Cast
 Robert De Niro as Paul Vitti
 Billy Crystal as Ben Sobel
 Lisa Kudrow as Laura Sobel
 Joe Viterelli as "Jelly"
 Cathy Moriarty-Gentile as Patti LoPresti
 Joey "Coco" Diaz as "Ducks"
 Thomas Rosales, Jr. as "Coyote"
 Kyle Sabihy as Michael Sobel
 Rebecca Schull as Ben's Mother
 Dr. Joyce Brothers as herself
 James Biberi as FBI Agent Miller
 Callie Thorne as FBI Agent Cerrone
 Firdous Bamji as Dr. Kassam
 John Finn as Richard Chapin
 Sylvia Kauders as Aunt Esther
 Pat Cooper as Masiello
 Steven Kampmann as Mr. Macinerny
 Tom Papa as Boyfriend
 Joe Torre as himself
 Paul Herman as Joey "Boots"
 Charles A. Gargano as Maitre'D
 Reg Rogers as Raoul Berman
 Frank Gio as Lou "The Wrench" Rigazzi
 Vinny Vella, Sr. as Mello
 Demetri Martin as P.A.
 Gina Lynn as Stripper
 Anthony LaPaglia as Antony Bella who plays Nicky Caesar in the fictitious series Little Caesar (uncredited)

Production

Pre-production
Initially, there was no plan to create a sequel to Analyze This, but the critical acclaim and box office success generated by the first film encouraged the producers to consider a sequel and discuss it with the studio and actors. They believed, as said by Crystal, that "there was an unfinished relationship between Ben Sobel and Paul Vitti from the first film" and "there was a good story to tell", so the sequel was commissioned.

The story of the sequel was inspired by an article in The New York Times about the psychotherapy used in the mafia TV show The Sopranos. Ramis said the article "raised questions about human nature and morality...Can the criminal mind be turned?" and he became interested in what would happen if "Paul Vitti got out of jail and committed himself to going straight."

The production arranged for Dr. Stephen A. Sands, a psychiatrist and faculty member of Columbia University College of Physicians and Surgeons to be a technical adviser for the film, and he remained on set during the filming of scenes that involved psychiatric issues. Sands was very familiar with the details of mobster Vincent "The Chin" Gigante's alleged mental illness, after studying the case during his post-doctoral training. Sands also arranged for De Niro to visit Bellevue Hospital's psychiatric unit to meet patients and psychiatrists to discuss the character's symptoms, and De Niro sometimes participated in group therapy sessions during these visits.

Filming
Filming began in April 2002, and most of the scenes were shot in and around New York City, 7 months after the 9-11 attacks. Producer Jane Rosenthal said they decided to shoot the film there because "[i]t would have been unpatriotic not to shoot the picture in New York... As a New Yorker it was extremely important for me to get back to work and business as usual after 9-11."

Filming locations for Vitti's attempts at lawful employment include an Audi dealership on Park Avenue in Manhattan, a jewelry store in the Diamond District on West 47th Street, and Gallagher's Steak House on West 52nd Street. The prison scenes were filmed at the Riker's Island prison in Queens, with the prison release scene shot outside the entrance to Sing Sing Prison in Ossining, New York. The funeral for Ben's father was filmed at Riverside Memorial Chapel on Manhattan's Upper West Side, and the Sobel household scenes shot in Montclair, New Jersey. The dinner at Nogo restaurant was filmed at West 13th Street in a restaurant that had closed down, and been refurbished by the film's art department. The scenes of Patty LoPresti's home were filmed in Ho-Ho-Kus, New Jersey, and the Little Caesar set in Washington Square Park, Manhattan. Car chases were filmed on New Jersey Turnpike service roads in Kearney. The heist-planning scenes were shot in two locations: a derelict building in the meat packing district near West 14th Street, and a club called Exit on West 56th Street. The majority of the heist scenes were shot in an empty lot in West 57th Street between 11th and 12th Avenues, and below a West Side Highway underpass. While filming part of the heist sequence at the New York State 369th Regiment armory, on 145th Street and Fifth Avenue, the film set was visited by former President Bill Clinton, who was pleased the movie was being filmed in New York. The scene at a drive-through bank where the money flies before the police chase was filmed in Carlstadt, New Jersey.

During filming in Manhattan's Chelsea district June 14, Amanda Winklevoss, older sister to Cameron and Tyler Winklevoss, died from unknown complications after climbing into a camera truck.

Cinematographer Ellen Kuras said that in shooting the film, the intention was to highlight the contrast between Vitti and Sobel's environments, because the film "exists in two different worlds... We wanted to evoke the contrast so we made Vitti's world cool, blue and blue-green, whereas Ben's world has a brighter, warmer palette, yellows and oranges that provide a neutral tone."

Reception

Box office
Analyze That opened in 2,635 theaters and grossed $11 million in its opening weekend, ranking in second place behind Die Another Day. The film went on to gross $32 million at the domestic box office and a further $23 million at the international box office for a worldwide total of $55 million against its $60 million budget.

Critical reception
On Rotten Tomatoes the film has an approval rating of 27% based on 150 reviews, with an average rating of 4.8/10. The site's consensus reads: "The one joke premise is stretched a bit thin in this messy sequel, but a few laughs can be had here and there." On Metacritic the film has a weighted average score of 37 out of 100, based on reviews from 34 critics, indicating "generally unfavorable reviews." Audiences polled by CinemaScore gave the film an average grade of "B" on an A+ to F scale.

Roger Ebert gave the film 2 out of 4 stars, and wrote "If the first film seemed to flow naturally from the premise, this one seems to slink uneasily onto the screen, aware that it feels exactly like a facile, superficial recycling job."

The film won the award for Worst Sequel at the 2002 Stinkers Bad Movie Awards.

References

External links

 
 

2002 films
American sequel films
2000s English-language films
2002 comedy films
American crime comedy films
Films about psychiatry
Films about the American Mafia
Films directed by Harold Ramis
Films set in New York City
Films shot in New York City
Films shot in New Jersey
Mafia comedy films
Village Roadshow Pictures films
Films with screenplays by Harold Ramis
Films with screenplays by Peter Tolan
Warner Bros. films
Films scored by David Holmes (musician)
2000s American films